A by-election was staged in the New South Wales Legislative Assembly district of Macquarie Fields on 17 September 2005. It was triggered by the resignation of sitting member and former minister Craig Knowles. The by-election was timed to coincide with two other state by-elections in Maroubra and Marrickville.

The by-election saw the Labor Party retain the seat with the election of candidate Steven Chaytor.

Results

Craig Knowles resigned.

Aftermath
Steven Chaytor's stint as a member of parliament would prove to be a short one. In January 2007 he was found guilty of domestic assault. As a result, Chaytor stepped down as an MP and did not contest the 2007 state election.

See also
Electoral results for the district of Macquarie Fields
List of New South Wales state by-elections

References 

2005 elections in Australia
New South Wales state by-elections
2000s in New South Wales